The Moluccan goshawk or Halmaheran goshawk (Accipiter henicogrammus) is a species of bird of prey in the family Accipitridae. It is endemic to Halmahera, Indonesia. Its natural habitats are subtropical or tropical moist lowland forest and subtropical or tropical moist montane forest.

References

Moluccan goshawk
Birds of the Maluku Islands
Moluccan goshawk
Moluccan goshawk
Taxonomy articles created by Polbot